Jacks Branch is a  long 2nd order tributary to Brown Creek in Anson County, North Carolina.

Variant names
According to the Geographic Names Information System, it has also been known historically as:  
Jacks Creek

Course
Jacks Branch rises about 5 miles southwest of Cedar Hill, North Carolina.  Jacks Branch then flows southeast to meet Brown Creek about 4 miles southwest of Ansonville, North Carolina.

Watershed
Jacks Branch drains  of area, receives about 47.9 in/year of precipitation, has a topographic wetness index of 429.10 and is about 47% forested.

References

Rivers of North Carolina
Rivers of Anson County, North Carolina
Tributaries of the Pee Dee River